Gofraidh mac Briain Mac an Bhaird, Gaelic-Irish bardic poet, fl. 16th-century.

A member of the Mac an Bhaird family of professional poets, Gofraidh is known from three surviving poems, Lámh indiu im thionnsgnamh, a Thríonóid, Dairt sonn dá seoladh go Tadhg and Doirbh don chéidsheal cinneamhuin tairngeartaigh.

References

 The Surnames of Ireland, Edward MacLysaght, 1978.

External links
 http://www.ucc.ie/celt/online/G402143/header.html
 http://www.irishtimes.com/ancestor/surname/index.cfm?fuseaction=Go.&UserID=

16th-century Irish-language poets
Irish religious writers
People from County Donegal
Year of birth missing
Year of death missing